Layla Rose Miller, also known as Butterfly, is a fictional character in the Marvel Comics universe.  She first appeared in House of M #4 (Sept 2005), and was created by Brian Michael Bendis and Olivier Coipel. Peter David has developed the character, placing Layla at the center of the ensemble of mutant private detectives in his title X-Factor.

Fictional character biography

House of M

Layla Miller is first seen as a young mutant girl who lives in Hell's Kitchen in New York City. When she wakes up one morning, she finds everything has changed and she is one of a small number of unaffected characters. Layla was instrumental in bringing down the "House of M" by using her ability to restore the memories of superheroes who rebelled and helped restore reality. Doctor Strange suggested that the Scarlet Witch had created Layla as a failsafe to help the heroes in case something went wrong.

Origin
Contradicting Doctor Strange's theory of her origin, Layla's life prior to the events of House of M has been described: she was a young mutant living in an orphanage where she was teased and bullied by other orphans. However, Layla was shown to have fabricated a large portion of her experiences at the orphanage in order to facilitate her entry into X-Factor Investigations; the extent of what really occurred is unknown. When asked, Layla has purported to understand how it is that she "knows stuff." She claims that if she were to tell anyone, she would be struck down and die on the spot, but since she has proven to be capable of manipulation, the veracity of her contention is in doubt.

X-Factor Investigations

After Layla joins X-Factor Investigations, she helps the other team members in various, indirect ways. When an operative of Singularity Investigations tries to murder Rictor, Layla electrocutes him. She then sends his body back to Singularity Investigations with a note that says "stay out of Mutant Town." After being taken back to an abusive orphanage, Jamie Madrox makes an arrangement that allows her to return at X-Factor where she would be safe. When Cyclops arrives to inform Siryn that her father, Banshee, has died, he pretends not to recognize Layla.

Layla has taken steps to deal with Singularity Investigations, a rival investigations firm. When X-Factor have their final showdown with Singularity Investigations, she helps uncover the fact that Guido had been brainwashed by them at some point in his past while rescuing a client. Jamie organizes all X-Factor members to see Doc Samson for psychiatric evaluations; they play chess and she reveals she is willing to make sacrifices for the greater good and that even she is expendable.

Civil War

During the Superhero Civil War, Quicksilver makes repeated attempts to enter X-Factor Investigations Headquarters. Each time, he is thwarted by Layla, whom Quicksilver comes to consider his nemesis.

When the rest of the team are discussing their stance in the war, they eventually begin to talk about M-Day. Later it is revealed that she knew the truth about why and how it happened, leaving the other members distrustful of her.

Silent War

When the Inhumans come looking for Quicksilver, Layla advises him that Black Bolt isn't going to kill him during the confrontation and that he should take a small trip to the future to see the outcome of what happens to them. She and Jamie go to the meeting where she reveals to Jamie that she tried to kill Pietro but couldn't because he escaped and that his actions are meant to happen.

X-Cell and Nicole
A group made up of ex-mutants by the name of X-Cell, who believe the government has depowered mutants, hides in Mutant Town. When Siryn and Monet return from France, they bring an ex-mutant named Nicole, which shocks Layla because she didn't know of her arrival. Layla visits Quicksilver, who had restored most of X-Cell's powers. She reveals to Callisto and Marrow that it was he and Wanda Maximoff who caused the Decimation; the government did not depower them, and Pietro has lied. After a failed attempt on Layla's life, Nicole is tripped by Layla and falls in front of a train, which destroys her, revealing she was actually a robot.

Around this time, she is also offered a place among Nick Fury's Secret Warriors by Daisy Johnson but declines, claiming the mutants will need her more.

Messiah Complex

Layla goes with one of Jamie's dupes to investigate an alternate future caused by the birth of the mutant messiah. While there, they discover that the mutants are living in internment camps. While in an internment camp, the mutant scanners alternate between detecting Layla as a mutant and detecting Layla as human. They learn from a child version of Bishop that the mutant messiah had caused this world. Layla then proceeds to kill the dupe to send the information back to the original Jamie, leaving her alone and stranded in the future.

Divided We Stand

Despite being trapped in an alternate future, Layla is still seen interacting with Jamie as a figment of his imagination. This figment serves as "stuff [Jamie] knows deep down", appearing in moments of self-realization, such as when Jamie admitted to himself that he knows about Siryn's pregnancy.

It is implied in Layla's final words in the story—'but not the right stuff' (in response to Jamie's 'I'm Jamie. I know stuff.')—as well as her eight days in a trance in the Layla Miller one-shot (after which she whispers the same lines she says to Jamie, 'One of us, One of us') that this 'figment' of Jamie's imagination is actually Layla contacting Jamie to give him some guidance.

The Summers Rebellion
Layla eventually escapes the camp and helps a new mutant called Linqon. After revealing to some people an operation called Operation Purity, which involves every citizen being tested for mutant genes, she goes to Atlantic City and meets up with Cyclops and his daughter Ruby. Together with Ruby, she initiates the Summers Rebellion. Layla is last seen stating that, while she is unsure of the future, she is confident in her ability to "know stuff."

Layla finds a way back into the past but is now much older than she was before. She pretends to be a nun and works with John Maddox, a duplicate who settled down to raise a family. When she arrives at John's church, she finds Jamie about to kill himself. She stops him and reveals who she really is, much to his shock. She reveals herself to be a holographic projection and takes Jamie into the alternate future. When Layla and Jamie return to the future, Jamie meets Ruby, who berates Layla for traveling back in time when warned not to. The group is then attacked by Sentinels.

After Layla and Jamie argue about how they never came for one another, the two finally give into their emotions and share a kiss. Jamie is awkward about starting a relationship with Layla, feeling she is still a child, though Layla tells him she never really was.

Later, Layla, Jamie and Ruby go find an old, frail Doctor Doom, requesting his help with time travel. Doom reveals he has met Layla before and informs the trio about Doomlocks. They are then attacked by Sentinels and saved by Trevor Fitzroy. They bring the frail Doom back to their stronghold in Atlantic City where she gets into an argument with Cyclops about bringing him with them and Trevor Fitzroy's future. Taking Doom to an old lab, he creates a Doomlock and turns on them, bringing forth Cortex, the rogue Madrox dupe. Cortex kills Trevor, and Ruby asks Layla if she can bring him back. Layla reveals that her ability isn't to "know stuff" but to bring back the dead. There are consequences to bringing back a human: the cost of their soul, conscience and morality.

When the battle is over and Layla explains what her powers are to Jamie, they are teleported by a Doomlock back in time and Jamie ends up back with X-Factor while Layla is transported back to before she joined up at X-Factor Investigations. She ends up at the orphanage she lived at before M-Day and, after talking with her younger self, she sets forth the motions that lead her to joining X-Factor by downloading all her knowledge into her younger version's brain, which causes her to pass out and give her the ability to "know stuff". Layla then gets up and walks away, contemplating what she did to herself. Cryptically, she informs her younger self that while she knows why Doom sent her further back, Jamie will find out in "a couple of years", apparently indicating that much time has elapsed since the current X-Factor series began (since Layla has only been "knowing stuff" since after the "House of M" event; prior to this, her ability was to awaken lost memories).

Return to present
Following the disappearance of the Invisible Woman, it is revealed Layla has been living with Dr. Doom in an advisory capacity for a year, awaiting to cross paths with X-Factor while they search for Susan Richards.

During the events of Second Coming, Bastion assigns Bolivar Trask and his Mutant Response Division to target and kill every member of X-Factor Investigations. Arriving at Dublin Airport, Layla and Shatterstar have come to the aid of Theresa Cassidy, who is now going by the codename Banshee. During the confrontation, Layla uses technology acquired from Dr. Doom to combat the MRD soldiers and point Monet in the right direction to help turn the tide of the battle.

After Monet's encounter with Baron Mordo, Layla has an almost violent encounter with Monet who doesn't trust her since finding out about her partnership with Dr. Doom. After Monet faints from exhaustion, she informs Guido that Wolfsbane has returned and joins the rest of X-Factor on a trip to Las Vegas.

When Guido receives a fatal shot while protecting J. Jonah Jameson, the doctors pronounce him dead. But upon their return to the room, he is seen alive with Layla hiding in the closet, suggesting she resurrected Guido. Layla speaks to Guido in the hospital and begins to cry. She cryptically tells Guido she'll find a way to get his soul back. Madrox has figured out that Layla has brought Guido (Strong Guy) back from death at the cost of his soul.

Shatterstar and Layla have a cryptic conversation about what happened between them during their time together at Doctor Doom's castle in Latveria. Shatterstar asks her if she has ever thought about what happened between them. She replies that she has, but she learned not to give in to her impulses, and he should do the same.

During a confrontation with Bloodbath, he stops the fight and tells the team that he can steal souls, but makes the team think why he couldn't take Strong Guy's. After being questioned by her teammates, Layla tells the X-Factor team the truth about reviving Strong Guy at the cost of his soul, before chanting a spell that sends Bloodbath to hell. She is later sitting in the morgue for days isolating herself from her teammates. Banshee (Siryn) is talking with Wolverine in the background about her behavior. Banshee attempts to console Layla, and Layla tells her to remove her hand or it will end up like Jamie (Madrox). Wolverine talks with her. It turns out that Layla has night terrors from her ordeal being stuck in the future, but they are down to once a week. She has also kept Jamie in a cooler of dry ice, and had a third year med student make repairs on the cadaver. Layla also states she doesn't know what she is waiting for. With the exception of Banshee, none of her teammates are talking to her for what she did to Guido. Wolverine questions how Layla didn't see Madrox's death coming. There is a flashback (flash-forward since it takes place 80 years in an alternate future) that shows Layla writing in a journal that described the outcome if Guido was left dead. She thought she could just ignore it but by reviving Guido it was Jamie who paid the price. Layla tells Wolverine that the reason she is even cryptically telling him this is because like him, she knows in her heart she really is alone in the crowd just like Wolverine. After Jamie is brought back from the dead, an ecstatic Layla states that she knew Jamie would be back and that she's wasted too much time and gives into her feelings for him. She proceeds to warm up Jamie from his frozen state by having sex with him. After their tryst, Layla admits to Jamie that she did revive Guido (Strong Guy) and doesn't want to keep any more secrets from him. She proceeds to tell him about the changes in X-Factor Investigations during his time away. Monet (M) becomes enraged after seeing Madrox alive, thinking that Layla was responsible for his resurrection. She slams Layla into a brick wall, then flies off with her into the New York skyline. Madrox tells Terry (Banshee/Siryn) to fly after them, but Terry says that if Monet really wanted to hurt her, she would have done it right there. Monet drops her off at the Empire State building and scares the tourists away so she and Layla can have words. Monet says to Layla that she always knows what's going on. Layla states that this is not the case, and she didn't resurrect Jamie (Madrox). She uses the telescope as an example of her not knowing every event as the events get closer and then blackout. Layla then tells Monet that Guido was supposed to have died and not Jamie. She states she wanted to change fate so Monet wouldn't blame herself for Guido's death, which would have resulted in her going through a year-long depression. She wanted to spare Monet, who according to Layla will eventually become her best friend the pain. After hearing all this, Monet leaves Layla so that she could have some space and collect her thoughts.

Layla also has a hand in being responsible for Terry becoming a true Banshee deity, and leaving the team. Before she could admit to Madrox that she was part of the reason that Terry left X-Factor investigations, Havok steps in and takes the blame. Polaris states that she knew that he covered for her. Havok admits that he wants Layla to be happy. Madrox and Layla later on go to the kitchen for ice cream and Madrox asks Layla if they want to get married. She responds: "Okay". They elope in Las Vegas, but the honeymoon is cut short due to the wedding priest being murdered the same night.

Retirement
After the events of the "Hell on Earth War" storyline, she and Jamie retire to his family farm where they have a child together. Some time later, Jamie goes to Muir Island to investigate the Terrigen Mists and is killed by the M-Pox. Soon afterwards, a different Jamie appears to take care of her and Davey. After a while, Logan reappears, asking her advice on what to do with Cyclops and the missing X-Men. She also encourages the new Jamie to help Cyclops.

Powers and abilities
Layla has the mutant power to resurrect someone from death, at the cost of their soul. They retain their memories but experience a lack of empathy upon resurrection that is similar to sociopathy. Although this was first hinted at in the conclusion of X-Factor'''s initial story arc when Layla brought a butterfly back to life, it was not fully expanded upon and explained until much later when Layla resurrected Trevor Fitzroy, knowing full well the murderous villain he would become due to her actions.

Layla's most notable ability is to "know stuff": Layla has extensive knowledge of past and future events, an effect which enables Layla to see paths of causality to their ultimate conclusion and allows her to alter certain events from occurring (referred to as "causality" in Secret Warriors #1). Initially, the reason for Layla "knowing stuff" was not explained and presented as a form of precognition. Layla herself, when questioned, would also remain evasive. Layla's knowledge is later revealed to be the result of her older self (time-displaced and aged due to the events of X-Men: Messiah Complex) visiting herself as a child prior to the events of X-Factor vol. 3 #1 and uploading all her knowledge and memories into her younger self's brain. The sheer volume of knowledge was too much for a normal brain to take, and thus resulted in several gaps and blind spots (not knowing that Strong Guy was brainwashed, that Josef Huber's companion Nicole was a robot, or the machinations of Damian Tryp, for example). Layla's foreknowledge is also heavily dependent on what her future self experienced and read from her younger self's journals, and thus she does not know what effects straying from this source might have (as in the case of Madrox's death).

Layla has above normal scientific knowledge and advanced weaponry due to her partnership with and tutelage under Dr. Doom. One such device that Layla now regularly employs is a power gauntlet capable of various effects such as force fields, giant saws, and energy blasts. Additionally, her time with Dr. Doom has imparted on her a basic knowledge of magic and mysticism, and Layla has been shown to be capable of performing exorcisms and the working of basic spells.

During House of M, Layla was immune to the memory alteration created by the Scarlet Witch and thus was aware that reality had been altered. Layla also had the ability to "awaken" heroes and allow them to remember their lives before the reality warp. This ability was also distinct enough that Rogue was able to absorb and use it similar to other superhuman abilities. Layla has not exhibited any of these abilities since the House of M storyline.

Writer Peter David addressed this disparity with Layla's powers in the letter column of X-Factor vol. 3 #231: "Layla... We've seen her powers spelled out more in the past few issues than any other time in the past. I wouldn't get too hung up on HoM (House of M) if I were you since she's very different from what she was."

Other versions

Ultimate Marvel
In Ultimate Mystery'', Dr. Layla Miller is a member of the Roxxon Brain Trust. Nothing else is known about her except that she "knows stuff". She is in the middle of a meeting when she is made aware that Alex Summers is in the Roxxon building. It's shown she specializes in acquiring resources for Roxxon. She is also responsible for giving powers to Cloak and Dagger.

References

External links
 Layla Miller at Marvel.com
 Newsarama: Layla Who? Bendis and Brevoort talk Layla Miller.
Profile of the character in Uncanny X-Men.net

Comics characters introduced in 2005
Fictional characters with death or rebirth abilities
Fictional private investigators
Characters created by Brian Michael Bendis
Marvel Comics mutants
Marvel Comics female superheroes
X-Factor (comics)